Typhoon Ma-on, known in the Philippines as Typhoon Ineng, was a large and powerful typhoon that affected southern Japan in July 2011. It was the sixth named storm and second typhoon of the 2011 Pacific typhoon season. Originating from an area of low pressure near Wake Island on July 9, the precursor to Ma-on gradually developed as it moved westward. By July 11, it had become sufficiently organized to be declared a tropical depression, although the cyclone's circulation remained broad. Over the following days, Ma-on gradually intensified and attained typhoon status on July 14. After turning northward in response to a weakening subtropical ridge, the typhoon underwent a series of eyewall replacement cycles that caused it to weaken. On July 19, Ma-on struck Shikoku before turning southeastward and moving back over water. Slow weakening continued as Ma-on succumbed to the effects of high wind shear. The system ultimately became extratropical on July 24, and was last noted by the Japan Meteorological Agency a week later near the Kamchatka Peninsula.

Initially, Ma-on posed a slight threat to the Mariana Islands and prompted the issuance of tropical storm warnings. However, the system remained far away from the area and only produced scattered rainfall. In Japan, hundreds of people evacuated from mudslide-prone areas. Five people perished as a result of Ma-on, and damage reached ¥3.9 billion (2011 JPY, $50 million 2011 USD).

Meteorological history

The origins of Ma-on were from an area of convection that meandered near Wake Island on July 9. The disturbance slowly consolidated and developed a low-level circulation. Based on the presence of low wind shear and generally favorable environmental conditions, tropical cyclone forecast models anticipated that the system would develop into a tropical cyclone. Early on July 11, the Joint Typhoon Warning Center (JTWC) issued a tropical cyclone formation alert, and a few hours later the Japan Meteorological Agency (JMA) reported the formation of a tropical depression about halfway between Wake Island and the Northern Marianas Islands. The JTWC followed suit and initiated advisories on Tropical Depression 08W.

The depression tracked westward due to a ridge to its north. Its circulation was initially broad and ill-defined, with patches of disorganized convection due to dry air. The depression was able to intensify due to generally favorable conditions, and the JMA upgraded the depression to Tropical Storm Ma-on at 0600 UTC on July 12. Gradually the thunderstorms became concentrated around the center, despite restricted outflow to the north and west. Ma-on intensified at a slower than climatological rate, although an eye feature became evident by early on July 13. At 0000 UTC that day, the JMA upgraded Ma-on to a severe tropical storm, and 24 hours later the storm intensified into a typhoon to the northeast of the Northern Marianas. A ragged eye became apparent on satellite imagery, and after developing an anticyclone aloft, its outflow became much better defined.

By July 15, Typhoon Ma-on had a well-defined eye with the strongest convection in its southern periphery. Late on July 15, Ma-on weakened slightly due to stronger wind shear, which caused its eyewall to break apart in the northwest quadrant. It re-intensified the next day after an eyewall replacement cycle commenced. Around that time, Ma-on began a motion to the northwest due to a weakening of the subtropical ridge, and it briefly entered the area warned by the Philippine Atmospheric, Geophysical and Astronomical Services Administration (PAGASA); the agency gave it the local name Ineng.

Late on July 17, Ma-on underwent another eyewall replacement cycle and weakened, despite developing improved outflow and convection in the northern quadrant. In addition, the intrusion of dry air diminished thunderstorms in the western periphery. By July 18, Ma-on reached the western extent of the ridge and began a motion to the north toward Japan. The next day, it turned to the northeast as it paralleled the Japan coastline just offshore. At around 1400 UTC on July 19, Ma-on made landfall on Shikoku as a minimal typhoon. Turning to the east, the typhoon weakened to a severe tropical storm before moving over the southern tip of the Kii Peninsula early on July 20. After emerging from the country, Ma-on turned to the southeast. Increased wind shear displaced the convection to the east, although slight re-intensification was expected. However, the JTWC downgraded Ma-on to a tropical depression on July 21 after the storm lost much of its convection. The circulation became ill-defined, and the JTWC discontinued advisories on July 22, noting the system was in the process of dissipation. However, the JMA maintained Ma-on as a severe tropical storm until July 23, by which time the storm had turned to the northeast. The storm became extratropical on July 24 near the Kuril Islands, lasting another seven days before dissipating east of the Kamchatka Peninsula.

Preparations and impact

After Ma-on attained tropical storm status, the Tiyan, Guam National Weather Service office issued a tropical storm watch for Agrihan, Pagan, and Alamagan. It was later upgraded to a tropical storm warning after Ma-on became a typhoon, which was canceled after the storm passed the islands to the north. The typhoon produced high waves in Guam, as well as gusty winds and precipitation in an outer feeder band.

High waves in advance of the typhoon capsized a boat in the East China Sea, although the six passengers were rescued. The heavy rainfall caused flooding and mudslides that blocked roadways and forced evacuations.

In Japan, the typhoon was forecast to strike areas affected by the Fukushima Daiichi nuclear disaster. Officials prepared by installing a cover to prevent rain contamination. Ultimately, there still was rain contamination, and Ma-on's passage produced 2,000 tons of radioactive water. Before the storm struck Japan, officials in Miyakonojō, Miyazaki advised the evacuation of about 900 people in areas prone to mudslides. At least 300 airline flights were canceled due to the storm. The typhoon also caused delays in the nation's rail system. Nippon Oil stopped shipping oil during the storm. The rains flooded houses and roads in the region. High rains closed several expressways, and in Shizuoka Prefecture, a blocked road stranded 96 mountain climbers. Strong winds left about 11,000 people without power on Shikoku Island. The combination of winds and rain damaged the 385‑year‑old Nijō Castle in Kyoto. The typhoon injured 60 people, and killed five people. One of the deaths was from a man who drowned while checking on his boat during the storm. Damage was estimated at ¥3.9 billion (2011 JPY, $50 million 2011 USD).

Following Ma-on's passage, temperatures decreased across Japan, which led to a marked decrease in heat stroke deaths. Throughout the month, heat stroke deaths were 70% less than in July 2010.

See also

Other storms of the same name

References

External links

JMA General Information of Typhoon Ma-on (1106) from Digital Typhoon
The JMA's Best Track Data on Typhoon Ma-on (1106) 
The JMA's RSMC Best Track Data (Graphics) on Typhoon Ma-on (1106)
The JMA's RSMC Best Track Data (Text)
The JTWC's Best Track Data on Typhoon 08W (Ma-on)
08W.MA-ON from the U.S. Naval Research Laboratory

2011 Pacific typhoon season
Typhoons
Typhoons in Japan
Typhoon Ma-on
Typhoons in the Northern Mariana Islands
July 2011 events in Japan
Ma-on